Sue E. Errington (born 1942) is a Democratic member of the Indiana House of Representatives representing District 34 (Muncie).  She is a former member of the Indiana Senate, representing the 26th District from 2006 to 2010. Prior to holding elected office she served 17 years as the Public Policy Director for Planned Parenthood of Indiana. Sue was married to Dr. Paul Errington, a professor emeritus of physics at Ball State University who died in 2016 and has two adult children.

References

External links
 Sue Errington Indiana State Legislature website
 Sue Errington Official Campaign website
 

Democratic Party members of the Indiana House of Representatives
Living people
Women state legislators in Indiana
University of Michigan alumni
21st-century American politicians
21st-century American women politicians
1942 births